Hilandar Fragments are a Serbian medieval manuscript from the end of the 10th and the beginning of the 11th century. It is one of the oldest preserved Slavic monuments written in Cyrillic script.

Hilandar Fragments contain two sheets and are parts of a sermon  Saint Cyril of Jerusalem (318-395).. They were discovered in 1844 in Hilandar monastery. Viktor I. Gligorovich donated them to the Novoruska State Library in Odessa - today Odessa University, where they are still kept.

Sources 
 Ст. Кульбакин, Хилендарские листки. Отрывок кирилловской письменности XI века, in: Памятники старославянского языка, том 1, Санкт Петербург, 1900

References

Hilandar
Medieval Athos
Athos manuscripts
Old Church Slavonic language
Medieval Serbian texts
Serbian manuscripts
Hilandar Monastery